The 204th Engineer Battalion was constituted on 1 December 1967 in the New York Army National Guard. This battalion was organized on 1 February 1967 from existing units in south-central New York. The headquarters of the unit was established in Binghamton, New York.

History 
The units which formed the battalion brought with them the campaign credits and unit awards earned in previous service to the United States. The Service Company has seven campaign credits for World War I and three credits for service in the Pacific during World War II. Company A has three campaign credits for World War I and another three for service in World War II. Company B has three World War I credits and nine World War II credits. Of the latter, five are for service in Europe and four are for service in the Pacific. The company also received a Meritorious Unit Commendation and a Philippine Presidential Unit Citation. Company C has one American Civil War credit, three World War I credits, and 10 World War II credits. Five of these are based on service of predecessor units in Europe and the other five are for service in the Pacific. In addition, Company C earned a Presidential Unit Citation for Saipan and a French Croix de Guerre with Silver Star for World War I service in the Meuse-Argonne. The unit was twice cited in the Order of the Day of the Belgian Army.

Recent service and the global War on Terror 
The 204th Engineer Battalion offered assistance to New York following the 11 Sept. attacks on the World Trade Center.
Elements of the battalion have been activated in support of the Global War on Terror, serving with distinction in both Afghanistan (Operation Enduring Freedom) and Iraq (Operation Iraqi Freedom). Additionally, the battalion has been activated numerous times for state service including response to the 2006 Southern Tier floods, and the February 2007 snow storms in Oswego, NY.  Among many distinguished members of the 204th Engineer Battalion are recent retiree's First Sergeant James Zemanick (HSC 1SG), MSG Jeffrey Mancuso (204 En Bn Operations Sergeant), SFC Susanna Stacy (Assistant Battalion Operations Sergeant) and SSG Paul Musa Jr (HSC Recon NCO).  MSG Mancuso and SSG Musa both have multiple combat tours. MSG Mancuso was awarded the Bronze Star for service with the NY STT (3/2 Stryker Brigade Combat Team) in Afghanistan.  SFC Stacy is OEF veteran who served in Afghanistan. 1SG Zemanick served in Operation Desert Shield/Storm.

Current structure 
In 2006, the battalion was restructured to further meet the needs of the National Guard. Companies A (Walton, NY) and B (Horseheads, NY) were combined and redesignated the 827th Engineer Company. Company C (Peekskill, NY) was integrated into the 1156th Engineer Company out of Kingston, NY. Additionally, the 152nd Engineer Company (Buffalo, NY) was reassigned to the 204th Engineer Battalion.

The Battalion is assigned to the 153rd Troop Command (Brigade), New York Army National Guard.

External links
204th Engineer Battalion

Battalions of the United States Army National Guard
Military units and formations in New York (state)
Organizations based in Binghamton, New York
Engineer battalions of the United States Army